As of 2020, Morocco had an installed wind power capacity of 1400 MW.

As of 2013, there was an installed capacity of 947 MW and 500 MW are under construction.

List of completed farms

List of farms under construction

See also 

 List of power stations in Morocco
 Energy in Morocco

References

External links

Morocco
Wind power in Morocco